William David Volk (born December 16, 1956) is an American  mobile game developer and publisher. He is the Chief Futurist of Forward Reality, a VR publisher. He was born in New York City.

Volk has worked extensively with Activison, he designed the (M.A.D.E) game engine and was technical producer of the 1992 game Leather Goddesses of Phobos 2, Return to Zork, The Manhole, Rodney's Funscreen and other adventure games.

History and achievements
Volk graduated from the University of Pennsylvania in 1979 with a BA in Physics and Astronomy. He later carried out graduate work in Physics and Computer Engineering at The University of New Hampshire. From there he moved to Avalon Hill Game Co. where he started the quality assurance division for the Microcomputer Game Division at Avalon Hill. from 1979-1982 where he created the games "Conflict 2500", "Voyager 1" and "Controller"

In 1983, he left Avalon Hill Game Co. and was employed by Rising Star where he created the "ValDraw CAD" (computer aided drafting) system for QX10 & Z80 personal computers and later became the Vice President of Development of Aegis Development where he authored some of the first Mac games, "The Pyramid of Peril" and "Mac Challenger" in 1984-1985. During that time, Volk also created the "Draw" and "Draw Plus" drafting programs for the Commodore Amiga.

In 1988 he moved to Activison where he became the Director of Technology, eventually becoming the VP of Technology in 1991. At Activision he was head of the team that produced the first entertainment CD-ROM title, The Manhole (based on the Cyan Hypercard game title). Volk created the game engine behind the Return to Zork as well as much of the user interface design. While at Activision, he invented and was awarded U.S. Patent #5,095,509 on March 10, 1992 which enabled IBM personal computers to reproduce digitally sampled audio.

During his time with Activison, he designed the (M.A.D.E) game engine.  M.A.D.E. was originally created for the DOS version of The Manhole and was used on the DOS Floppy and CD-ROM versions, the NEC 9801 version and the FM Towns version as well as LGOP2, for the Return to Zork and Rodney's Funscreen.

Volk was co-founder and CTO of Save.com (now Redplum.com) where he and his team developed the first grocery coupons available on the Internet with bar codes.

Over the Years Volk has founded, co-founded and contributed to a number of companies, including ZipProof, The Bonus Mobile Entertainment (co-founded that with Sherri Cuono) where he co-designed a multiplayer mobile game titled The Dozens which was licensed from the card game of the same name created by the Wayans Brothers.

While at BME he also created the ringtone brand known as Rude Tones. PlayScreen LLC acquired the assets of MyNuMo (a company co-founded my Volk with Sherri Cuono in 2006) in Nov. 2010. Volk is credited with creating the concept for iWhack, the first iPhone game released (July 2007). Volk co-designed several games at MyNuMo including Pigs A Pop'N, and Bailout Bonanza. Volk is currently the Chief Futurist of Forward Reality, LLC.

In November 2015 Volk became the CMO of Tricerat, an enterprise software company, while still being a member of PlayScreen, LLC. Volk continued to consult with Tricerat until 2017 and was the project manager of the Print Reliably app released in 2017.

In October 2019 William Volk produced and published The Climate Trail, a post-climate apocalypse game based on the classic game The Oregon Trail.  Game music composed by George Sanger (musician).

He is now consultant of Shiba Games

Games

Various roles
 Voyager I (1981), Avalon Hill
 Conflict 2500 (1981), Avalon Hill
 Controller (1982), Avalon Hill
 Universe (1983), Omnitrend
 The Manhole (1989), Activision
 Shanghai II: Dragon's Eye (1990), Activision
 Ultimate Air Combat (1992), Activision
 Rodney's Funscreen (1992), Activision
 The Manhole: New and Enhanced (1992), Activision
 Leather Goddesses of Phobos 2 (1992) Activision 
 Return to Zork (1993), Activision

Co-designer
 The Dozens (2004), Bonus Mobile Entertainment
 iWhack (2007), MyNuMo
 Pigs A Pop'n (2008), MyNuMo
 Word Carnivale (2012), PlayScreen

References

External links
 Mobygames
 
 Bio on climatetrail.com

1956 births
Living people
American video game designers
University of New Hampshire alumni
University of Pennsylvania alumni
Video game developers